Colin Wynn Crorkin,  (born 31 January 1957) was the UK's Ambassador to the Gambia from 2014 to 2017.

Early life
Crorkin was born in Edinburgh and attended the Rowlinson School in Sheffield.

Career
He joined the Foreign Office in 1975. He became ambassador to the Gambia in June 2014, having been appointed in early January 2014. Gambia had only recently withdrawn from the Commonwealth.

In 2018 Sharon Wardle became the new ambassador.

Personal life
He married Joanne Finnamore in 1991. They have one son and two daughters,

References

External links
 Biography

 

1957 births
Ambassadors and High Commissioners of the United Kingdom to the Gambia
Members of the Order of the British Empire
Diplomats from Edinburgh
People from Meadowhead
Living people
Scottish diplomats